Neil Campbell (21 March 1880 – 25 April 1960) was an Australian politician.

He was born in Winkleigh, Tasmania. In 1922 he was elected to the Tasmanian House of Assembly as a Nationalist member for Wilmot. He was Chair of Committees from 1931 to 1934, when he briefly became a minister. From 1945 to 1950 he served as Leader of the Opposition. He resigned from the House of Assembly in 1955 to contest Tamar in the Legislative Council, which he represented until his death in 1960 in Launceston.

References

1880 births
1960 deaths
Nationalist Party of Australia members of the Parliament of Tasmania
Liberal Party of Australia members of the Parliament of Tasmania
Members of the Tasmanian House of Assembly
Members of the Tasmanian Legislative Council
Leaders of the Opposition in Tasmania
20th-century Australian politicians